The MV Tacoma is a  operated by Washington State Ferries. Launched in 1997, it was the first in its class in the Washington State Ferries fleet. Since delivery, the Tacoma has almost exclusively been assigned to the busy Seattle–Bainbridge Island route.

Electrical failure 
On July 29, 2014, the vessel suffered a catastrophic electrical failure, in which most of the ship's electrical system was destroyed. The Tacoma lost power in Bainbridge Island's Eagle Harbor and dropped anchor to prevent her from beaching making it the "second time in 40 years that a state ferry was forced to drop anchor." The MV Sealth, which was serving the Seattle-Bremerton route at the time, made a detour up to Eagle Harbor to tow the Tacoma away from shore until tugboats could guide her back to the slip. The Tacoma remained out of service for nearly nine months while repairs were made. After four weeks of sea trials and approval from the United States Coast Guard, the Tacoma returned to service on the Seattle-Bainbridge route on March 28, 2015.

References

External links 

MV Tacoma vessel info from WSDOT

Washington State Ferries vessels
1997 ships
Ships built in Tacoma, Washington